In swimming, a turn is a reversal of direction of travel by a swimmer. A turn is typically performed when a swimmer reaches the end of a swimming pool but still has one or more remaining pool lengths to swim.

Types

Open turn: is where the swimmer touches the wall, with one or two hands depending on the requirement for the stroke, (not grabbing) and brings legs to the wall in a tuck-like position, then turning on the wall to face the opposite end of the pool and pushes off in a streamline position to begin a new lap.  Butterfly and breaststroke swimmers must touch with two hands, then one arm is typically dropped into the water to begin the turn while the other comes past the head to complete the turnaround from the wall and then the swimmer will push off into a streamline. See also Butterfly stroke#Turn and finish.
Tumble turn (also known as flip turn or turntable turn): the swimmer swims to the end wall, tucks, does a forward flip, and pushes off in streamline.  While typically only done in backstroke and freestyle modalities, it is legal in all events provided that in butterfly and breastroke both hands touch the wall simultaneously and immediately prior to the turn. See also Front crawl#Racing: turn and finish.
Backwards flip turn, bucket turn, or suicide turn:  a turn used in the individual medley when changing from backstroke to breaststroke. The turn involves a touch on the wall in backstroke, followed by a back flip which puts the swimmer in position to push off into breaststroke.

See also
Swimming innovation

References

Swimming